Little Bass River may refer to:

 Little Bass River (East Gippsland), in Victoria, Australia
 Little Bass River, Nova Scotia, Canada

See also
Bass River (disambiguation)